John, Johnny, or Jock Simpson may refer to:

Politicians
John Simpson (Parliamentarian), politician of the post-English Civil War period, see Thomas Kelsey
John Simpson (Kentucky politician) (died 1813), American attorney and politician
John Simpson (MP for Wenlock) (1763–1850), English member of parliament for Wenlock
John Simpson (Lower Canada politician) (1788–1873), government official and politician in Quebec
John Simpson (Niagara politician) (1807–1878), Canadian businessman and politician
John Simpson (Ontario politician) (1812–1885), Ontario banker and member of the Senate of Canada
Sir John Hope Simpson (1868–1961), British Liberal politician and administrator in India
John A. Simpson (1854–1916), Canadian politician
John Thomas Simpson (1870–1965), Conservative member of the Canadian House of Commons
John Simpson (died 1803), British member of parliament for Mitchell
John Simpson (Kansas politician) (born 1934), former Kansas State Senator

Cultural figures
John Simpson, bassist in the American R&B band The S.O.S. Band
John Simpson (artist) (1782–1847),  British painter who painted The Captive Slave
John Simpson (actor/producer), Canadian actor
Sir John William Simpson (1858–1933), English architect
John Simpson (architect) (born 1954), British modern-day classical architect
John Palgrave Simpson (1807–1887), Victorian playwright
John L. Simpson (born 1963), Australian film and theatre producer, writer and distributor
John Simpson (journalist) (born 1944), BBC journalist, foreign correspondent and author

Academic figures
John Simpson (fine arts academic), former head of the School of Fine Arts at the University of Canterbury
John Baird Simpson (1894–1960), Scottish geologist
John B. Simpson (born 1947), former president of the University at Buffalo
John Wistar Simpson (1914–2007), American electrical engineer
John Simpson (lexicographer) (born 1953)
John Alexander Simpson (1916–2000), physicist
John Simpson (British nuclear physicist) (born 1958)

Sports figures
Jock Simpson (1886–1959), England and Blackburn Rovers footballer
John Simpson (footballer, born 1918) (1918–2000), English footballer, played for Huddersfield Town and York City
John Simpson (footballer, born 1933) (1933–1993), English footballer, played for Lincoln City and Gillingham
John Simpson (boxer) (born 1983), Scottish featherweight boxer
John Simpson (English cricketer) (born 1988), Middlesex County Cricket Club
John Simpson (New Zealand cricketer) (1907–1980), Auckland cricket team
John Simpson (fencer) (1927–2016), Australian Olympic fencer
John Simpson (basketball), professional basketball player
John Simpson (American football) (born 1997), American football offensive lineman
Johnny Simpson (1922–2010), New Zealand rugby union player
John Simpson (rugby union) (1872–1921), Scottish rugby union player

Military figures
John Simpson (soldier) (1748–1825), American Revolutionary War soldier at the Battle of Bunker Hill
John Simpson (VC) (1826–1884), Scottish recipient of the Victoria Cross
John Simpson Kirkpatrick (1892–1915), Australian World War I war hero (who enlisted as "John Simpson")
John Simpson (RAF officer) (1907–1967), senior RAF officer in the mid-1950s and eighth Commandant Royal Observer Corps
John Simpson (British Army officer) (1927–2007), British Army officer and Director SAS

Miscellaneous figures
John Simpson (journalist/consumer advocate) (born 1948), American consumer rights advocate and former journalist
John Simpson (martyr), one of the Marian martyrs
John Simpson (Presbyterian) (1740–1808), of South Carolina, in the American Revolutionary War
John Simpson (Unitarian) (1746–1812), of Bath, English Unitarian minister and religious writer
John Woodruff Simpson (1850–1920), American lawyer and founding partner at Simpson Thacher & Bartlett
John D. Simpson (1901–1988), Canadian businessman in the Canadian Mining Hall of Fame
John Milton Bryan Simpson (1903–1987), American judge
John Simpson (police official) (born 1932), former director of US Secret Service and Interpol
John Simpson (priest) (born 1933), Anglican clergyman

See also
John Simson (1668–1740), Scottish theologian
Jack Simpson (disambiguation)
Jackie Simpson (disambiguation)